System of a Down is an Armerian-American metal band formed by musicians of Armenian origin: vocalist Serj Tankian, guitarist Daron Malakian, bassist Shavo Odadjian, and drummer John Dolmayan in the mid-1990s. They have released five studio albums, nineteen singles (including promotional releases), and thirteen music videos. By the end of 1997, the group had signed to American Recordings, then distributed as Columbia Records. The following year, they released their eponymous debut album, which peaked at number 124 on the United States' Billboard 200 and number 103 on the United Kingdom's UK Albums Chart; it was later certified double platinum by the Recording Industry Association of America (RIAA) and gold by Canadian Recording Industry Association (CRIA). Their eponymous debut album produced a single for the song "Sugar", which reached the top 30 on the Billboard mainstream rock songs and alternative songs charts. Their follow-up album, Toxicity (2001), topped the US and Canadian charts, and also reached the top 10 in Australia, Finland, and New Zealand. The album was certified triple platinum in its home country, and triple platinum in Australia by the Australian Recording Industry Association (ARIA), as well as double platinum by Music Canada. Toxicity produced singles for the title track, "Chop Suey!", and "Aerials". The last of these peaked at number one on the Billboard Mainstream Rock Songs and Alternative Songs charts.

Steal This Album! (2002) failed to repeat the same success as its predecessor, reaching the top 20 in only the US and Australia. Three years later, the group produced a double album, with the two sections released six months apart. The first, entitled Mezmerize, was released in early 2005; it peaked at number one in nine countries, and certified triple platinum in Canada, platinum in the US and Australia. This album's first single, "B.Y.O.B.", peaked at No. 27 on the Billboard Hot 100 and No. 26 on the UK Singles Chart. The follow-up, "Question!", reached the top 40 in the United Kingdom and Ireland. Later that year, the group released the second part, Hypnotize. Like its predecessor, the album peaked at number one in the US, Canadian, Finnish, and New Zealand charts. System of a Down is the first band since The Beatles to release two chart-topping albums in the US in the same year. Hypnotize was certified platinum in US, and gold in Australia, Germany, and Switzerland. It produced two singles, the title track and "Lonely Day", which reached No. 4 and No. 16 on the Finnish chart, respectively. In 2006, the group went on a hiatus, and since then, all members had begun work on side projects. A reunion was announced on November 29, 2010. On November 5, 2020, System of a Down released their first songs in 15 years, "Protect the Land" and "Genocidal Humanoidz". Both songs also received a music video and marked the band's first single in 14 years, since "Lonely Day".

Studio albums

Demo albums

Singles

Promotional singles

Music videos

Other works
Limited Edition Tour CD (2000): Limited edition EP given out at live shows. Includes three studio tracks and three live tracks.
More Toxicity (2001): Limited edition French EP. Contains four live tracks and bonus track "Johnny".
Toxicity II (2002): Unofficial bootleg/fan leak of songs from the Toxicity sessions. Most songs would later end up on Steal This Album!.
Storaged Melodies (2002): Unofficial bootleg compiling works for OST and collective works.
Hypnotize Value Added (2005): Best Buy exclusive EP. Only available from Best Buy stores before the album Hypnotize was released. Retailed for $1.99 and contained a coupon for $1.99 off the price of the album when it was released on November 22, 2005.

Other appearances
Chef Aid: The South Park Album (1998) – "Will They Die 4 You?" (with Mase, Puff Daddy & Lil' Kim)
Strangeland (1998) – "Marmalade"
Book of Shadows: Blair Witch 2 (2000) – "Mind"
Dracula 2000 (2000) – "The Metro" (Berlin cover)
Heavy Metal 2000 (2000) – "Störagéd"
Loud Rocks (2000) – "Shame" (Wu-Tang Clan Cover)
MTV The Return of the Rock (2000) – "Suite-Pee"
Nativity in Black, Vol. 2: A Tribute to Black Sabbath (2000) – "Snowblind" (Black Sabbath Cover)
Scream 3 (2000) – "Spiders"
Not Another Teen Movie (2001) – "The Metro" (Berlin cover)
The Scorpion King (2002) – "Streamline"
Tony Hawk's Pro Skater 4 (2002) – "Shimmy"
Ozzfest 2002 Live Album (2002) – "Needles"
ATV Offroad Fury 2 (2002) – "Science"
Pledge of Allegiance Tour: Live Concert Recording (2002) – "Chop Suey!", "Bounce", and "Toxicity"
Disturbia (2007) – "Lonely Day"
Rock Band 2 (2008) – "Chop Suey!"
Guitar Hero World Tour (2008) – "B.Y.O.B"
Guitar Hero: Metallica (2008) – "Toxicity"
Rocksmith 2014 (2014) – "Hypnotize"
Rock Band 4 (2015) – "Spiders"
The Secret Life of Pets (2016) – "Bounce"

Notes

References
General

 
 

Specific

External links

Official website
[ System of a Down] at AllMusic
System of a Down at Discogs

Discography
Heavy metal group discographies
Discographies of American artists